Tentamus Group Ltd is an international group of laboratories headquartered in Berlin and Munich. The focus of the laboratories lies in the TIC industry, where tests, consultations, and help in labelling is offered to the food & feed, pharmaceutical, cosmetic, nutraceutical & supplement, agriculture & environmental, and medical device industries.



About the Group 

As of 2021, there are over 80 laboratories in the Tentamus Group providing analytical services. Tests that are performed on samples include:

 Instrumental Analytics
 Physical Chemistry
 Mechanical and simulation
 Microbiology
 Molecular biology
 Sensory testing 
 
The above mentioned analysis methods makes the Tentamus Group a part of the food supply chain, providing services ranging from testing a product’s makeup and contents, as well as identifying potential safety hazards such as allergens or pathogens.

History 

The Tentamus Group started when bilacon GmbH became the first member in 2011. The first international expansions occurred in Spain and the USA in 2014. In 2015, Tentamus Shanghai was founded, thus marking the first steps on the Asian market.
As of December 2021, there are over 80 laboratories within the Tentamus Group. These labs are as follows:

Recent operations 

The acting CEOs of the Tentamus Group are Dr. Jochen Zoller and Abgar Barseyten. In 2017, Forbes mentioned Abgar Barseyten as an innovative founder to watch and learn from.

As of 2019, Tentamus has 2,500 full-time employees globally, who test 1,500,000 samples per year in 65 labs worldwide. 15,000 on-site inspections are also performed each year.

Tentamus laboratory QSI Bremen appeared in Netflix series Rotten, season 1 episode 1: Lawyers, Weapons, and Honey. The theme of this episode was the dilution of honey using cheap syrups. The documentary stated that QSI Bremen had been combating food fraud in honey since the 1950s. In the documentary, Gudrun Beckh stated “as long as there are profits to be made, the fraud shall continue”.

References 

German companies established in 2011
Laboratories in Germany